Kretania hesperica, the Spanish zephyr blue, is a species of butterfly in the family Lycaenidae. It is endemic to Spain.  Its natural habitats are temperate shrubland and temperate grassland. It is threatened by habitat loss. Seitz describes it (as a race of L. sephyrus Friv.) thus - hesperica Rbr. (78 h) is above sky-blue instead of violet-blue; from Spain.

References

Butterflies of Europe
Kretania
Endemic fauna of Spain
Butterflies described in 1839
Taxa named by Jules Pierre Rambur
Taxonomy articles created by Polbot
Taxobox binomials not recognized by IUCN